The National White Collar Crime Center, also known as NW3C, is a congressionally funded non-profit corporation which trains state and local law enforcement agencies to combat emerging economic and cyber crime problems. The NW3C provides the general public with information and research on preventing economic and cyber crime.

Purpose
The National White Collar Crime Center provides training, investigative support, and research to organizations involved in preventing, investigating and prosecuting economic and high tech crime.

Partner agencies

Bureau of Justice Assistance
Federal Bureau of Investigation
Fraternal Order of Police
International Association of Chiefs of Police
National Organization of Black Law Enforcement Executives
National Sheriffs' Association

References

External links
 
 Frequently Asked Questions
 The Informant blog — official blog, with articles for law enforcement about white collar and computer crime

Commercial crimes
Computer security organizations
Henrico County, Virginia
Law enforcement in the United States
Non-profit organizations based in Glen Allen, Virginia